Louis Vorster (2 November 1966 – 17 April 2012) was a South African-Namibian cricketer. He was a left-handed batsman and a right-arm off-break bowler. He was born in Potchefstroom.

Vorster made his cricketing debut for Albatross cricket club on 1 July 1983, in a victory against the Sussex Second XI at Glynde. Vorster scored a duck in this first innings though the team were to create a victory with just one over to spare.

Vorster's first-class debut came in the 1985/86 Castle Bowl tournament, playing for Transvaal B against Eastern Province, and played in the Castle Currie Cup in the 1986/87 season. He became part of a South African invitation XI who played against an Australian XI in a South African tour of 1986/87, and, during the 1987 and 1988 English cricket seasons, played occasional games for the Warwickshire Second XI.

Playing for Transvaal until 1990, Vorster played for Northern Transvaal from this season onwards, in the B&H Series and the Castle Currie Cup, in its various guises.

Vorster continued to play for Northern Transvaal until the 1995/96 B&H Series, following which he moved to North West. Vorster played in the competition for North West until the 1998/99 season.

Nine years later, Vorster made a return to the first-class game, playing for the Namibian cricket team, for whom he made his debut in October 2007 against North West at the age of nearly 41.

Vorster was shot and killed during an armed robbery outside Pretoria on 17 April 2012. He was 45.

References

External links
Louis Vorster at Cricinfo
Louis Vorster at Cricket Archive

1966 births
2012 deaths
South African cricketers
Namibia cricketers
Gauteng cricketers
Worcestershire cricketers
Northerns cricketers
North West cricketers
Deaths by firearm in South Africa
Male murder victims
People murdered in South Africa